The Ayutthaya Kingdom (IAST:  or), the Empire of Ayutthaya (1569–1767), or the Ayutthaya Empire, was a Siamese kingdom that existed in Southeast Asia from 12 March 1351 to 7 April 1767, centered around the city of Ayutthaya, in Siam, or present-day Thailand. European travellers in the early 16th century called Ayutthaya one of the three great powers of Asia (alongside Vijayanagar and China). The Ayutthaya Kingdom is considered to be the precursor of modern Thailand, and its developments are an important part of the history of Thailand.

The Ayutthaya Kingdom emerged from the mandala/merger of three maritime city-states on the Lower Chao Phraya Valley in the late 13th and 14th centuries (Lopburi, Suphanburi, and Ayutthaya). The early kingdom was a maritime confederation, oriented to post-Srivijaya Maritime Southeast Asia, conducting raids and tribute from these maritime states. After two centuries of political organization from the Northern Cities and a transition to a hinterland state, Ayutthaya centralized and became one of the great powers of Asia. From 1569 to 1584, Ayutthaya was a vassal state of Taungoo Burma, but quickly regained independence. In the seventeenth and eighteenth centuries, Ayutthaya emerged as an entrepôt of international trade and its cultures flourished. The reign of Narai ( 1657–1688) was known for Persian influence and the sending of the 1686 Siamese embassy to the French court of King Louis XIV. The Late Ayutthaya Period saw the departure of the French and English but growing prominence of the Chinese. The period was described as a "golden age" of Siamese culture and saw the rise in Chinese trade and the introduction of capitalism into Siam, a development that would continue to expand in the centuries following the fall of Ayutthaya.

Ayutthaya's failure to create a peaceful order of succession and the introduction of capitalism undermined the traditional organization of its elite and the old bonds of labor control which formed the military and government organization of the kingdom. In the mid-18th century, the Burmese Konbaung dynasty invaded Ayutthaya in 1759–1760 and 1765–1767. In April 1767, after a 14-month siege, the city of Ayutthaya fell to besieging Burmese forces and was completely destroyed, thereby ending the 417-year-old Ayutthaya Kingdom. Siam, however, quickly recovered from the collapse and the seat of Siamese authority was moved to Thonburi-Bangkok within the next 15 years.

In foreign accounts, Ayutthaya was called "Siam", but many sources say the people of Ayutthaya called themselves Tai, and their kingdom Krung Tai meaning 'Tai country'. It was also referred to as Iudea in a painting requested by the Dutch East India Company.

History

Origins 

The lower Chao Phraya Basin around the turn of the second millennium was split between Lopburi (Lavo), which dominated the eastern half of the Lower Chao Phraya, and Suphanburi, which dominated the west. The lower Chao Phraya Basin was also influenced by Angkor culture but not direct Angkorian political and military influence. Ayutthaya, argued by Charnvit Kasetsiri, was the merger of four different port polities along the Lower Chao Phraya Basin: Lopburi, Suphanburi, Ayutthaya, and Phetchaburi. Suphanburi had first sent a tribute mission to Song dynasty in 1180 and Phetchaburi to the Yuan dynasty in 1294.

The city of Ayutthaya is likely to have existed before the supposed "foundation" in 1351. Archaeological findings have found evidence of buildings on the island of Ayutthaya prior to the 12th century. Pottery shards have been discovered to have been dated as early as the 1270s. Some temples to the east of Ayutthaya, off the island, have been known to exist before 1351. Recent archaeological works reveal pre-existing barays superimposed on by subsequent structures. The Tamnan mulasasana Buddhist chronicle notes that in the 1320s, two Buddhist monks visited Ayutthaya in search of scriptures and that a previous monk had been honored by the "King of Ayodhia" on his return from Lanka. Other contemporary scholars argued that Ayutthaya had been an important commercial center since the 11th century or at least several centuries prior to 1351.

The earliest written records of Ayutthaya in the Chinese chronicles is that a Chinese official fled to Xian in 1282/83. Xian first sent an embassy to China in 1292, who the Chinese then requested another embassy soon after that, signifying Ayutthaya's early prominence before Ayutthaya's founding. While older and traditional scholars argue that the ethnically Thai Sukhothai or Suphanburi was the Xiān mentioned in Chinese sources, more recent scholarship, like Chris Baker and Pasuk Phongpaichit, argue that Xian referred to Ayutthaya as that was the same name later used for Ayutthaya by the Chinese court. Michael Vickery argued that it is likely the Chinese used Xian to refer to the lower Chao Phraya Basin from its inception.

The traditional founding of Ayutthaya 
Ayutthaya was traditionally founded by King Uthong on 4 March 1351. This fact, however, has been subject to long scholarly debate. According to Chris Baker-Pasuk Phongpaichit, there are at least seven legends about who Uthong was: "a Northern Thai prince, a fugitive Chinese prince from the sea, a Khmer noble from Angkor, a ruler from one of the gulf cities, or a Chola." Other than being the legendary founder of Ayutthaya, the only thing known about Uthong in the chronicles is the year of his death.

Early maritime dominance 

 

In the 1290s through to the 1490s, Ayutthaya sent forces down to the peninsula and demanded tribute from the Malay principalities all the way down to Temasek (modern Singapore) and Sumatra. The early Ayutthaya polity was a maritime-oriented confederation, more in line with the Malay polities of Maritime Southeast Asia than with states inland like Sukhothai and the Northern Cities. Muslim and European mapmakers labelled the Malay peninsula up to the Tenasserim coast as part of Ayutthaya in the 15th and early 16th centuries. Early Ayutthaya did not keep records and their early dynastic chronology is likely fabricated by later Ayutthaya elites writing their past histories: the early chronology in the palace chronicles does not correlate with the Ayutthaya temple chronicles nor the Chinese court chronicles.

The integrity of the patchwork of cities of early Ayutthaya Kingdom was maintained largely through familial connections under the mandala system. King Uthong had his son, Prince Ramesuan, the ruler of Lopburi (Lavo), his brother, the ruler of Praek Sriracha(in modern Chainat Province) and his brother-in-law, Khun Luang Pa-ngua, the ruler of Suphanburi. The ruler of Phetchaburi was his distant relative. The king would appoint a prince or a relative to be the ruler of a city, and a city that was ruled by a prince was called Muang Look Luang. Each city ruler swore allegiance and loyalty to the King of Ayutthaya but also retained certain privileges.

Politics of Early Ayutthaya was characterized by rivalries between the two dynasties; the Uthong dynasty based on Lopburi and the Suphannabhum dynasty based on Suphanburi. Traditional narratives argued that Ayutthaya conquered Sukhothai, Angkor, etc, but more modern narratives argue that territorial conquest was a European thing and not a Southeast Asian thing. Rather, the processes which saw Ayutthaya expand was one of political merger and consolidation between the cities at the head of the peninsula and slowly ascending up the Chao Phraya River Basin to the Northern Cities.

The culture of early Ayutthaya, described by Ma Huan, a scribe on Zheng He's voyages, in the early 15th century, described Ayutthaya as a rowdy port town, whose men practice fighting on water, and where the affairs of everyday life was arranged by the women. The cities on the peninsula regularly complained to the Chinese court about constant Siamese attacks down the peninsula around this time period.

Age of warfare 
The 1430s through to 1600 marked a period of rising warfare throughout Mainland Southeast Asia. In 1500, the Portuguese noted that Ayutthaya had 100 elephants, 50 years later, Ayutthaya had 50,000 elephants. Ayutthaya began launching military land expeditions far to the west and east. In the west, Ayutthaya fought to acquire the cities of Tavoy, Mergui, Tenasserim, and Martaban in the late 15th century. Song China's increasing interests to sea commerce at the turn of the second millennium made trade between China and the Indian Ocean especially lucrative. In the 1430s, Ayutthaya attacked Angkor, but did not sack the city, although Ayutthaya did install a short-lived puppet ruler. 

Palace Law Codes under Trailokkanat exemplified the newfound attention to warfare, citing a number of rewards for the number of enemies beheaded. The introduction of elephants, guns, and mercenaries made wars in Southeast Asia much more chronic and much more deadly. By the late 16th century, Pegu (Bago) suffered a severe conscript revolt, Ayutthaya phrai fled into the forests or bribed the conscription officers, and the construction of sturdier and stronger city walls made warfare largely ineffective.

Transition to a hinterland state 

The Ayutthaya Kingdom shifted from a maritime state to more of a hinterland state during the 15th and 16th centuries. Its absorption of the Northern Cities and the shifting of trade power to the inland trade routes with China facilitated this change of policy. The reign of King Borommatrailokkanat was the peak of this merger between the basin and the Northern Cities, being the scion of generations of intermarriage between the two.

Even though Trailokkanat symbolized the merger between North and South, the Lan Na Kingdom, a state North of Ayutthaya (modern-day Northern Thailand), contested Ayutthaya's growing influence over the Northern Cities. The Ayutthaya-Lan Na War was fought over the Upper Chao Phraya valley for control of the Northern Cities. Whether he preferred the Northern Cities to Ayutthaya or the necessity to have a capital closer to the war, Trailokkanat moved his capital to Phitsanulok. Lan Na suffered setbacks and Trailokkanat eventually sued for peace in 1475.

Ayutthaya's sphere of influence down the peninsula was contested by the Malacca Sultanate. Ayutthaya launched several abortive conquests against Malacca which was diplomatically and economically fortified by the military support of Ming China. In the early-15th century the Ming admiral Zheng He established a base of operation in the port city, making it a strategic position the Chinese could not afford to lose to the Siamese. Under this protection, Malacca flourished, becoming one of Ayutthaya's great foes until the capture of Malacca by the Portuguese. Ayutthaya's attention to the portage routes across the upper peninsula meant that it did not send a military expedition to the lower peninsula and the Malay States throughout the 16th century.

Centralization and dominance of the Northern lords

Ayutthaya's sphere of influence was now stretched from the Northern Cities to the Malay Peninsula, with its heartland centered around the old Ayutthaya-Suphanburi-Lopburi-Phetchaburi polity. The Muang Look Luang system was inadequate to govern relatively vast territories. The government of Ayutthaya was centralized and institutionalized under King Trailokkanat in his reforms promulgating in Palatine Law of 1455, which became the constitution of Ayutthaya for the rest of its existence and continued to be the constitution of Siam until 1892, albeit in altered forms. The central government was dominated by the Chatusadom system ( lit. "Four Pillars), in which the court was led by two Prime Ministers; the Samuha Nayok the Civil Prime Minister and the Samuha Kalahom the Grand Commander of Forces overseeing Civil and Military affairs, respectively. Under the Samuha Nayok were the Four Ministries. In the regions, the king sent not "rulers" but "governors" to govern cities. The cities were under governors who were from nobility not rulers with privileges as it had previously been. The "Hierarchy of Cities" was established and cities were organized into four levels. Large, top level cities held authorities over secondary or low-level cities.

The increased wealth of Ayutthaya resulted in the beginnings of a chronic succession struggle for the Ayutthaya throne. Due to the lack of stable succession law, from each succession from the 16th century onwards, princely governors or powerful dignitaries claiming their merit gathered their forces and moved on the capital to press their claims, culminating in several bloody coups. With the dominance of the Suphanburi clan, it now had to face the militaristic nobles of the Northern Cities, who increasingly came south for wealth prospects at a increasingly wealthy and powerful Ayutthaya. The first real succession struggles in Ayutthaya occurred in the early 16th century, with the Northern lords playing a prominent role. Under the reign of Maha Chakkraphat, the Northern lords, led by the Lord of Phitsanulok, Maha Thammarachathirat, became kingmakers in Ayutthaya. The final nail for this transition was the overthrow of the Suphanburi clan from the Ayutthaya throne following the 1569 Burmese capture of Ayutthaya, placing Maha Thammarachathirat on the Ayutthaya throne. 

The 15th century also marked a turning point in Ayutthaya's view of itself. King Trailokkanat performed some sort of coronation, the first in Ayutthaya history, in the 1460s. Prior to the 15th century, Ayutthaya's palaces and temples were inferior in grandeur to cities such as Sukhothai and Phitsanulok. By the early 16th century, Ayutthaya had now rivalled its regional competitors in its city grandeur, building magnificent wats and palaces for kings with a number of tributary states.

First Burmese wars 

Starting in the middle of the 16th century, the kingdom came under repeated attacks by the Taungoo dynasty of Burma. The Burmese–Siamese War (1547–1549) resulted in a failed Burmese siege of Ayutthaya. A second siege (1563–1564) led by King Bayinnaung forced King Maha Chakkraphat to surrender in 1564. The royal family was taken to Pegu (Bago), with the king's second son Mahinthrathirat installed as the vassal king. In 1568, Mahinthrathirat revolted when his father managed to return from Pegu as a Buddhist monk. The ensuing third siege captured Ayutthaya in 1569 and Bayinnaung made Maha Thammarachathirat (also known as Sanphet I) his vassal king, instating the Sukhothai dynasty.

In May 1584, less than three years after Bayinnaung's death, Uparaja Naresuan (or Sanphet II), the son of Sanphet I, proclaimed Ayutthaya's independence. This proclamation resulted in repeated invasions of Ayutthaya by Burma which the Siamese fought off ultimately finishing in an elephant duel between King Naresuan and Burmese heir-apparent Mingyi Swa in 1593 during the fourth siege of Ayutthaya in which Naresuan famously slew Mingyi Swa, although the existence of this battle has been challenged by modern scholars such as Sulak Sivaraksa. Today, this Siamese victory is observed annually on 18 January as Royal Thai Armed Forces day. Later that same year warfare erupted again (the Burmese–Siamese War (1593–1600)) when the Siamese invaded Burma, first occupying the Tanintharyi province in southeast Burma in 1593 and later the cities of Moulmein and Martaban in 1594. In 1599, the Siamese attacked the city of Pegu but were ultimately driven out by Burmese rebels who had assassinated Burmese King Nanda Bayin and taken power.

In 1613, after King Anaukpetlun reunited Burma and took control, the Burmese invaded the Siamese-held territories in Tanintharyi province, and took Tavoy. In 1614, the Burmese invaded Lan Na which at that time was a vassal of Ayutthaya. Fighting between the Burmese and Siamese continued until 1618 when a treaty ended the conflict. At that time, Burma had gained control of Lan Na and while Ayutthaya retained control of southern Tanintharyi (south of Tavoy).

Peace and commerce 

The cessation of warfare around 1600 gave way to a prolonged period of peace a commerce, beginning with the reign of Ekathotsorot. The Portuguese and Dutch conquest of Malacca encouraged Asian traders to bypass Malacca by crossing the portage route mid-peninsula, controlled by Ayutthaya. This was a period of the great Asian empires: Ottoman Empire, Safavid Empire, Mughal Empire, Ming and Qing China, and Tokugawa Japan. Ayutthaya therefore became the lucrative middleman for trade between the global empires of the Early Modern World. Kings and nobles turned to hunting, trade, and the competition for the throne with the ending of warfare.

This period of Ayutthaya is also characterized by the emergence of mercantile absolutism, where the king had a virtual monopoly on all incomes into the kingdom, allowing the king to build new temples and palaces, sponsor ceremonies, and enshroud the monarchy in ritual mysticism. The king had the power to appoint governors of cities in the inner Ayutthaya mueang (cities) as well as appoint ministers in charge of the government. This however all made the target of the throne much more lucrative and rewarding than before. To be able to successfully put your target onto the throne would immensely reward its facilitators as much as the winner of the crown. The ability to appoint a Front Palace was effective in times of war but became a double-edged sword in regards to peace. Foreigners, due to their lack of connections within the kingdom, often became prominent officials within the Ayutthaya court during this period.

Later Phitsanulok dynasty to early Prasat Thong dynasty 

In 1605, Naresuan died of illness while on campaign against a Burmese spillover conflict in the Shan region, leaving a greatly expanded Siamese kingdom to be ruled by his younger brother, Ekathotsarot (Sanphet III).  Ekathotsarot's reign was marked with stability for Siam and its sphere of influence, as well as increased foreign interactions, especially with the Dutch Republic, Portuguese Empire, and Tokugawa Shogunate (by way of the Red Seal Ships), among others.  Indeed, representatives from many foreign lands began to fill Siam's civil and military administration - Japanese traders and mercenaries led by Yamada Nagamasa, for example, had considerable influence with the king.

Ekathotsarot's era ended with his death in 1610/11.  The question of his succession was complicated by the alleged suicide of his eldest legitimate son, Suthat, while his second legitimate son, Si Saowaphak, was never legally designated as an heir by Enkathotsarot himself.  Nonetheless, Si Saowphak succeeded to the throne against his late father's wishes, and led a short and ineffective reign in which he was kidnapped and held hostage by Japanese merchants, and later murdered.  After this episode, the kingdom was handed to Songtham, a lesser son born of Enkatotsarot and a first-class concubine.

Songtham temporarily restored stability to Ayutthaya and focused inward on religious construction projects, most notably a great temple at Wat Phra Phutthabat.  In the sphere of foreign policy, Songtham lost suzerainty of Lan Na, Cambodia and Tavoy, expelled the Portuguese, and expanded Siam's foreign trade ties to include both the English East India Company and French East India Company, along with new merchant colonies in Siam representing communities from all across Asia.  Additionally, Songtham maintained the service of Yamada Nagamasa, whose Japanese mercenaries were at this point serving as the king's own royal guard.

As Songtham's life began to fade, the issue of succession generated conflict once again when both King Songtham's brother, Prince Sisin, and his son, Prince Chetthathirat, found support for their claims among the Siamese court.  Although Thai tradition typically favored brothers over sons in matters of inheritance, Songtham enlisted the help of his influential cousin, Prasat Thong to ensure his son would inherit the kingdom instead.  When Songtham died in 1628, Prasat Thong used his alliance with Yamada Nagamasa's mercenaries to purge everyone who had supported Prince Sisin's claim, eventually capturing and executing Sisin as well.  Soon Prasat Thong became more powerful in Siam than the newly-crowned King Chetthathriat, and through further intrigue staged a coup in which Chetthathirat was deposed and executed in favor of his even younger brother Athittayawong, whom Prasat Thong intended to use as a puppet ruler.

This form of government was quickly met with resistance by elements within the Thai court who were dissatisfied with the idea of having two acting heads of state.  Since Prasat Thong already ruled Siam in all but name as Kalahom, he opted to resolve the issue by orchestrating the final dethronement and execution of the child king in 1629.  Thus, Prasat Thong had completely usurped the kingdom by double (perhaps triple) regicide, extinguishing the Sukhothai dynasty 60 years after its installation by the Burmese.  Many of King Prasat Thong's former allies abandoned his cause following his ascension to the throne. In the course of quelling such resistance, Prasat Thong assassinated his former ally Yamada Nagamasa in 1630 (who now opposed Prasat Thong's coup), and promptly banished all the remaining Japanese from Siam.  While a community of Japanese exiles were eventually welcomed back into the country, this event marks the end of the Tokugawa Shogunate's long-standing formal relationship with the Ayutthaya Kingdom.

Persian and French influences 

Upon his death in 1656, King Prasat Thong was succeeded first by his eldest son, Chai, who was almost immediately deposed and executed by the late King's brother, Si Suthammaracha, who in turn was defeated in single combat by his own nephew, Narai.  Narai finally assumed a stable position as King of Ayutthaya with the support of a mainly foreign court faction consisting of groups that had been marginalized during the reign of his father, Prasat Thong. Among his benefactors were, notably, Persian, Dutch, and Japanese mercenaries.  It should therefore come as no surprise that the era of King Narai was one of an extroverted Siam.  Foreign trade brought Ayutthaya not only luxury items but also new arms and weapons. In the mid–17th century, during King Narai's reign, Ayutthaya became very prosperous.

In 1662 war between Burma and Ayutthaya (the Burmese-Siamese War (1662-64)) erupted again when King Narai attempted to take advantage of unrest in Burma to seize control of Lan Na. Fighting along the border between the two adversaries continued for two years and at one time Narai seized Tavoy and Martaban. Ultimately, Narai and the Siamese ran out of supplies and returned home back within their border.

While commercially thriving, Narai's reign was also socially tumultuous.  Much of this can be attributed to three-way conflict between the Dutch, French, and English trading companies now operating in Siam at an unprecedented intensity due to Siam's role as a center of trade, fostered by Narai.  Of these competing foreign influences, Narai tended to favor relations with the French, wary of the growing Dutch and English colonial possessions in the South China Sea. Soon, Narai began to welcome communities of French Jesuits into his court, and pursue closer relations with both France and the Vatican. Indeed, the many diplomatic missions conducted by Narai to such far-flung lands are some of the most celebrated accomplishments of his reign.  Narai as well leased the ports of Bangkok and Mergui to the French, and had many French generals incorporated into his army to train it in Western strategy and supervise the construction of European-style forts.  During this time, Narai abandoned the traditional capital of Ayutthaya for a new Jesuit-designed palace in Lopburi.

As a growing Catholic presence cemented itself in Siam, and an unprecedented number of French forts were erected and garrisoned on land leased by Narai, a faction of native Siamese courtiers, Buddhist clergy, and other non-Catholic and/or non-French elements of Narai's court began to resent the favorable treatment French interests received under his reign.  This hostile attitude was especially directed at Constantine Phaulkon, a Catholic Greek adventurer and proponent of French influence who had climbed to the rank of Narai's Prime Minister and chief advisor of foreign affairs.  Much of this turmoil was primarily religious, as the French Jesuits were openly attempting to convert Narai and the royal family to Catholicism.

Narai was courted not just by Catholic conversion, but as well by proselytizing Muslim Persians, Chams and Makassars in his court, the later of which communities launched an unsuccessful revolt in 1686 to replace Narai with a Muslim puppet king.  While members of the anti-foreign court faction were primarily concerned with Catholic influence, there is evidence to suggest that Narai was equally interested in Islam, and had no desire to fully convert to either religion.

Nonetheless, a dissatisfied faction now led by Narai's celebrated Elephantry commander, Phetracha, had long planned a coup to remove Narai.  When the king became seriously ill in May 1688, Phetracha and his accomplices had him arrested along with Phaulkon and many members of the royal family, all of whom were put to death besides Narai, who died in captivity in July of that year. .  With the king and his heirs out of the way, Phetrachathen usurped the throne and officially crowned himself King of Ayutthaya on August 1. 

King Phetracha took Mergui back from French control almost immediately, and began the pivotal Siege of Bangkok, which culminated in an official French retreat from Siam.  Pretacha's reign, however, was not stable.  Many of Phetracha's provincial governors refused to recognize his rule as legitimate, and rebellions by the late Narai's supporters persisted for many years.  The most important change to Siam in the aftermath of the revolution was Phetracha's refusal to continue Narai's foreign embassies.  King Phetracha opted instead to reverse much of Narai's decisions and closed Thailand to almost all forms of european interaction except with the Dutch.

Late Ayutthaya period

Continued prosperity and increased Chinese connections 
Despite the departure of most Europeans from Ayutthaya, their economic presence in Ayutthaya was negligible in comparison to the Ayutthaya China-Indian Ocean trade. Lieberman, later reinforced by Baker and Phongpaichit, refutes the idea that Siam's alleged isolationism from global trade following the French and English departure in 1688 led to Ayutthaya's gradual decline leading up to its destruction by the Burmese in 1767, stating: 

Instead, the 18th century was arguably the Ayutthaya Kingdom's most prosperous, particularly due to trade with Qing China. The growth of China's population in the late 17th-18th centuries, alongside nationwide rice shortages and famines in Southern China, meant that China was eager to import rice from other nations, particularly from Ayutthaya. During the Late Ayutthaya Period (1688–1767), the Chinese population in Ayutthaya possibly tripled in size to 30,000 from 1680 to 1767. The Chinese played a pivotal role in stimulating Ayutthaya's economy in the last 100 years of the kingdom's existence and eventually played a pivotal role in Siam's quick recovery from the Burmese invasions of the 1760s, whose post-Ayutthaya monarchs (Taksin and Rama I), held close ties, through blood and through political connections, to this Sino-Siamese community.

Succession conflicts and corruption 
Between 1600 and 1767, all but two royal successions were contested in a mini civil war in the capital. The throne became such a powerful and lucrative source of wealth during the 150 years of prosperity that many royals harbored ambitions to seize the throne. An Ayutthaya noble in the 18th century lamented that a large portion of court officials and able generals were killed in multiple succession struggles over the past 90 years. The last monarch, Ekkathat, alongside his brother, Uthumphon, undermined Prince Thammathibet, the Front Palace Uparaj and designated heir to his father, King Borommakot, by instigating or exposing his affair with two of his fathers' consorts. Prince Thammathibet was executed for his alleged crimes.

Corruption was rampant due to economic prosperity. Position buying and bribery for political offices became commonplace.

Introduction of capitalism, rise of commoners, and proto-nationalism 
The mass arrival of Chinese farming settlers to Siam in 18th century introduced Capitalism to Siam. The past 150 years of growth encouraged phrai to flee the bonds of government control and become peasant farmers in the countryside to earn wealth. People fled the government phrai system in a variety of other ways, including entering the monkhood and fleeing into the wilderness. 

A new category for people now appeared in the late Ayutthaya records, called phrai mangmi, or a rich "serf".

From 1688 onwards, the period was characterized by the increasing severity of commoner revolts. The 1688 mass commoner revolt against French Catholicism was unprecedented in Ayutthaya history prior to 1688. The revolts of 1688 also marked the beginning of a kind of proto-nationalism, in which the concept of a proto-Siamese Buddhist nationality was formed. However, Ayutthaya kings only occasionally viewed themselves as the defender of "the kingdom, people [sic], and Buddhism", which wouldn't be fully realized until the Thonburi and Bangkok regimes in response to the traumatic destruction of the Siamese state in 1767.

Nobility and Buddhism 

The 150 years of prosperity brought significant fortunes to the Ayutthaya elite. The Ayutthaya elite created theatre tropes and held elaborate celebrations, funeral ceremonies, and were awarded royal titles, all of which was previously privilege only to royalty.

Kings and nobles now contested with one another for control of the decreasing pool of labor. Repeated Ayutthaya laws on improving the controls of labor highlighted the increasing failures of the elite to control the people.

The turmoil which resulted from increasing wealth resulted in the Ayutthaya nobility turning towards the reformation of Buddhism as a new source of societal order. This was symbolized with the reign of King Borommakot (1733-1758), who was championed as a pious king for having all the characteristics of a virtuous and pious Bodhisattva: building and restoring new temples and dramatically transforming the Ayutthaya skyline during his reign. In 1753, following the request made by a delegation of Sri Lankan monks who traveled to Ayutthaya, Borommakot sent two Siamese monks to reform Theravada Buddhism in Sri Lanka.

It will however take until the early Rattanakosin period for the surviving Ayutthaya nobility (under the future King Rama I of the Rattanakosin Kingdom) to successfully reform Buddhism in their image and form a near unbroken bond between the Siamese monarchy and Buddhism lasting until the present in modern Thailand.

Military and political situation to 1759 
In the period between 1600 and 1759, there were smaller-scale wars, in the absence of major wars. Narai tried (and failed) to capture Chiang Mai in the 1650s and 1660s. Ayutthaya fought with the Nguyễn Lords (Vietnamese rulers of south Vietnam) for control of Cambodia starting around 1715. On the contrary, however, the Ayutthaya Kingdom and the Restored Taungoo dynasty traded an embassy with each other in the 17th century and overall generally engaged in harmonious relations.

Ayutthaya's military organization had remained virtually unchanged for the previous 150 years. Ayutthaya still heavily relied on its mercenary forces. It had failed to create an elite military caste like the Samurai of Japan or the Sikh Rajputs, perhaps due to Ayutthaya kings purposely undermining the creation of such an elite group of warriors that can significantly influence or challenge the throne. On the other hand, the city of Ayutthaya relied on the wet season monsoons making the city impenetrable to a siege for six months a year. Ayutthaya had over time amassed a huge stockpile of large cannons and arms that amazed the Burmese when they opened the treasury of Ayutthaya in the sack of Ayutthaya in 1767. It however lacked the men to arm these weapons, with the failure of the Ayutthaya corvee system and  increased economic incentives for phrai to escape due to greater integration with the world's economy over the past 150 years of peace.

Fall 

In the 1740s, the collapse of Taungoo Burma from a Lower Burma revolt created the new militaristic Konbaung regime of Upper Burma. By the mid 1750s, they had successfully crushed the Restored Hanthawaddy Kingdom of Lower Burma and reunified Burma. 

The first Burmese invasion in 1759–1760, from the newly ascendant Konbaung dynasty, besieged Ayutthaya but failed to capture the city, but successfully took the Tenasserim port city of Tavoy (Dawei), which Ayutthaya had recently took during the Burmese civil wars.

In 1765, a combined 40,000-strong Burmese force invaded the territories of Ayutthaya from the north and west. Major outlying towns quickly capitulated and failed to reinforce Ayutthaya's forces in the capital. Despite that, a number of the inhabitants of the city of Ayutthaya, including its foreign community, fought bravely for a year and a half, which the Burmese chronicles note. After a 14-month siege, the city of Ayutthaya fell and was destroyed on 7 April 1767, although other dates are sometimes given. Ayutthaya's art treasures, the libraries containing its literature, and the archives housing its historic records were almost totally destroyed, and the Burmese brought the Ayutthaya Kingdom to ruin. Lieberman states that, "hundreds of thousands possibly died during the [1765-67] Burmese invasion." Many people were either forcibly taken by the Burmese or fled into the forests. Objects were hauled back to Burma. Whatever that wasn't movable was burned by Burmese soldiers.

The fall of Ayutthaya was, paraphrasing historians Chris Baker and Pasuk Phongpaichit, "a failure of defense, a failure of dealing with rising wealth". By 1767, Ayutthaya had become a prize that many kingdoms would have seek to acquire. In an age where warfare was fought among kings than ethnic boundaries, a number of Siamese joined the Burmese in the sack of Ayutthaya, including the governor of Suphanburi. Ayutthaya nobles who were seized from Ayutthaya settled according to their stations at the court of Ava and settled in well, according to the Burmese chronicles. To paraphrase the words of historian Nidhi Eoseewong, the "kingdom fell even before the walls of Ayutthaya fell".

Aftermath

Within weeks, most of the Burmese forces went back to Burma. The Burmese were also fighting a significant war with the Chinese since 1765, nearly seizing Ava while the Burmese were invading Ayutthaya. The sole Burmese garrison in Siam was at Pho Sam Thon, outside of the former capital, composed of just a few thousand men. Even a significant number of them were withdrawn from Siam with the increasingly perilous situation in Burma.

With most Burmese forces having withdrawn, the country was reduced to chaos. The government apparatus of the Ayutthaya Kingdom within the capital was completely destroyed. Provinces proclaimed independence under generals, rogue monks, and members of the royal family.

Ayutthaya however, according to Liberman, represented centuries of political and economic development that was hard to destroy. One general, Phraya Taksin, former governor of Tak and of Siamese-Chinese descent, began the reunification effort. He gathered his forces and retook the ruined capital of Ayutthaya from the Burmese garrison at Pho Sam Thon in June 1767, using his connections to the Chinese community to lend him significant resources and political support. He finally established a capital at Thonburi, across the Chao Phraya from the present capital, Bangkok. Taak-Sin ascended the throne, becoming known as King Taak-Sin or Taksin. By 1771, he reunited Siam (with the exception of the cities of Mergui and Tenasserim) and defeated all local warlords. The new conflict between Burma and Siam would last for another 50 years, depopulating large areas of Siam (including the Northern Cities and Phitsanulok, the former second capital of Ayutthaya) and leaving some areas deserted as late as the 1880s.

The palaces and temples that marked Ayutthaya as a royal capital was reduced to "heaps of ruins and ashes". The city, described by a Danish visitor in 1779 to be a ""terrible spectacle", totally buried in undergrowth and inhabited by elephants and tigers," was resettled quite soon after, with former Ayutthaya temples being used for festivals and celebrations following the sack. According to one historian, the post-Ayutthaya monarchs were the real demolishers of the former capital, they took apart most of the ruins that survived the Burmese sack for the construction of the new capital at Bangkok for symbolic and practical reasons; Bangkok was the successor of Ayutthaya in the eyes of the new Bangkok elite and therefore had to transfer its spiritual power through the reuse of its bricks to build Bangkok while the prospect of future Burmese invasions meant that there was not enough time to build a capital via the traditional method during the early Rattanakosin Kingdom.

Government

Kings 

In its early maritime phase, Ayutthaya rulers were leaders of a port city. Ma Huan described the ruler of Ayutthaya in the 15th century as a ruler wearing gold-trimmed pants who rides on an elephant inspecting the city with one attendant and a ruler who lives in a modest-looking residence. Their relationships to the other cities were a first among equals status. Early Ayutthaya rulers had to balance their interests alongside those of their city vassal states. As Ayutthaya incorporated the Northern Cities and adapted their government functions in the 15th and 16th centuries, Ayutthaya rulers became more regal and assumed more power at the cost of their vassal cities. As the kings became richer through trade in the 17th century, they used their wealth to express their power, including the shrouding of the monarch in Angkorian and Brahmic rituals and symbolism.

The kings of Ayutthaya from the 17th century onwards were absolute monarchs with semi-religious status. Their authority derived from the ideologies of Hinduism and Buddhism as well as from natural leadership. The king of Sukhothai was the inspiration of Inscription 1 found in Sukhothai, which stated that King Ramkhamhaeng would hear the petition of any subject who rang the bell at the palace gate. The king was thus considered as a father by his people.

At Ayutthaya, however, the paternal aspects of kingship disappeared. The king was considered the chakkraphat (Sanskrit chakravartin) who through his adherence to the law made all the world revolve around him. According to Hindu tradition, the king is the avatar of Vishnu, destroyer of demons, who was born to be the defender of the people. The Buddhist belief in the king is as righteous ruler who strictly follows the teaching of Gautama Buddha and aims at the well-being of his people.

The kings' official names were reflections of those religions: Hinduism and Buddhism. They were considered as the incarnation of various Hindu gods: Indra, Shiva, or Vishnu (Rama). The coronation ceremony was directed by brahmins as the Hindu god Shiva was "lord of the universe". However, according to the codes, the king had the ultimate duty as protector of the people and the annihilator of evil.

According to Buddhism, the king was also believed to be a bodhisattva. One of the most important duties of the king was to build a temple or a Buddha statue as a symbol of prosperity and peace.

For locals, another aspect of the kingship was also the analogy of "The Lord of the Land" or "He who Rules the Earth" (Phra Chao Phaendin). According to the court etiquette, a special language, Rachasap ('royal language'), was used to communicate with or about royalty. In Ayutthaya, the king was said to grant control over land to his subjects, from nobles to commoners, according to the sakna or sakdina system codified by King Borommatrailokkanat (1448–1488). The sakdina system was similar to, but not the same as feudalism, under which the monarch does not own the land. While there is no concrete evidence that this land management system constituted a formal palace economy, the French François-Timoléon de Choisy, who came to Ayutthaya in 1685, wrote, "the king has absolute power. He is truly the god of the Siamese: no-one dares to utter his name." Another 17th century writer, the Dutchman Jan van Vliet, remarked that the King of Siam was "honoured and worshipped by his subjects second to god." Laws and orders were issued by the king. For sometimes the king himself was also the highest judge who judged and punished important criminals such as traitors or rebels.

In addition to the sakdina system, another of the numerous institutional innovations of Borommatrailokkanat was to adopt the position of uparaja, translated as 'viceroy' or 'prince', usually held by the king's senior son or full brother, in an attempt to regularise the succession to the throne—a particularly difficult feat for a polygamous dynasty. In practice, there was inherent conflict between king and uparaja and frequent disputed successions. However, it is evident that the power of the throne of Ayutthaya had its limits. The hegemony of the Ayutthaya king was always based on his charisma based on his age and supporters. Without supporters, bloody coups took place from time to time. The most powerful figures of the capital were always generals, or the Minister of Military Department, Kalahom. During the last century of Ayutthaya, bloody fighting among princes and generals, aiming at the throne, plagued the court.

With the exception of Naresuan's succession by Ekathotsarot in 1605, 'the method of royal succession at Ayutthaya throughout the seventeenth century was battle.' Although European visitors to Thailand at the time tried to discern any rules in the Siamese order of succession, noting that in practice the dead king's younger brother often succeeded him, this custom appears not to have been enshrined anywhere. The ruling king did often bestow the title of uparaja upon his preferred successor, but in reality, it was an 'elimination process': any male member of the royal clan (usually the late king's brothers and sons) could claim the throne of Ayutthaya for himself, and win by defeating all his rivals. Moreover, groupings of nobles, foreign merchants, and foreign mercenaries actively rallied behind their preferred candidates in hopes of benefiting from each war's outcome.

Mandala system 

Ayutthaya politically followed the mandala system, commonly used throughout Southeast Asia kingdoms before the 19th century. In the 17th century, the Ayutthaya monarchs were able to frequently appoint non-natives as governors of Ayutthaya-controlled towns and cities, in order to prevent competition from its nobility. By the end of the Ayutthaya period, the Siamese capital held strong sway over the polities in the lower Chao Phraya plain but had a gradually looser control of polities the further away from the capital at Ayutthaya. The Thai historian Sunait Chutintaranond notes, "the view that Ayudhya was a strong centralized state" did not hold and that "in Ayudhya the hegemony of provincial governors was never successfully eliminated."

Political development

Social classes 

The reforms of King Borommatrailokkanat (r. 1448–1488) placed the king of Ayutthaya at the centre of a highly stratified social and political hierarchy that extended throughout the realm. Despite a lack of evidence, it is believed that in the Ayutthaya Kingdom, the basic unit of social organization was the village community composed of extended family households. Title to land resided with the headman, who held it in the name of the community, although peasant proprietors enjoyed the use of land as long as they cultivated it. The lords gradually became courtiers and tributary rulers of minor cities. The king ultimately came to be recognized as the earthly incarnation of Shiva or Vishnu and became the sacred object of politico-religious cult practices officiated over by royal court brahmans, part of the Buddhist court retinue. In the Buddhist context, the devaraja (divine king) was a bodhisattva. The belief in divine kingship prevailed into the 18th century, although by that time its religious implications had limited impact.

Ranking of social classes 

With ample reserves of land available for cultivation, the realm depended on the acquisition and control of adequate manpower for farm labor and defense. The dramatic rise of Ayutthaya had entailed constant warfare and, as none of the parties in the region possessed a technological advantage, the outcome of battles was usually determined by the size of the armies. After each victorious campaign, Ayutthaya carried a number of conquered people back to its own territory, where they were assimilated and added to the labour force. Ramathibodi II (r. 1491–1529) established a corvée system under which every freeman had to be registered as a phrai (servant) with the local lords, chao nai. When war broke out, male phrai were subject to impressment. Above the phrai was a nai, who was responsible for military service, corvée labour on public works, and on the land of the official to whom he was assigned. Phrai Suay met labour obligations by paying a tax. If he found the forced labour under his nai repugnant, he could sell himself as a that ('slave') to a more attractive nai or lord, who then paid a fee in compensation for the loss of corvée labour. As much as one-third of the manpower supply into the 19th century was composed of phrai.

Wealth, status, and political influence were interrelated. The king allotted rice fields to court officials, provincial governors, and military commanders, in payment for their services to the crown, according to the sakdina system. Understandings of this system have been evaluated extensively by Thai social scientists like Jit Phumisak and Kukrit Pramoj.  The size of each official's allotment was determined by the number of commoners or phrai he could command to work it. The amount of manpower a particular headman, or official, could command determined his status relative to others in the hierarchy and his wealth. At the apex of the hierarchy, the king, who was symbolically the realm's largest landholder, theoretically commanded the services of the largest number of phrai, called phrai luang ('royal servants'), who paid taxes, served in the royal army, and worked on the crown lands.

However, the recruitment of the armed forces depended on nai, or mun nai, literally meaning 'lord', officials who commanded their own phrai som, or 'subjects'. These officials had to submit to the king's command when war broke out. Officials thus became the key figures in the kingdom's politics. At least two officials staged coups, taking the throne themselves while bloody struggles between the king and his officials, followed by purges of court officials, were common.

King Trailok, in the early-16th century, established definite allotments of land and phrai for the royal officials at each rung in the hierarchy, thus determining the country's social structure until the introduction of salaries for government officials in the 19th century.

Outside this system to some extent were the sangha (Buddhist monastic community), which all classes of men could join, and the overseas Chinese. Wats became centers of Thai education and culture, while during this period the Chinese first began to settle in Thailand and soon began to establish control over the country's economic life.

The Chinese were not obliged to register for corvée duty, so they were free to move about the kingdom at will and engage in commerce. By the 16th century, the Chinese controlled Ayutthaya's internal trade and had found important places in civil and military service. Most of these men took Thai wives as few women left China to accompany the men.

Uthong was responsible for the compilation of a Dharmaśāstra, a legal code based on Hindu sources and traditional Thai custom. The Dharmaśāstra remained a tool of Thai law until late in the 19th century. A bureaucracy based on a hierarchy of ranked and titled officials was introduced, and society was organized in a related manner. However, the caste system was not adopted.

The 16th century witnessed the rise of Burma, which had overrun Chiang Mai in the Burmese-Siamese War of 1563–1564. In 1569, Burmese forces, joined by Thai rebels, mostly royal family members of Thailand, captured the city of Ayutthaya and carried off the whole royal family to Burma (Burmese-Siamese War 1568–1570). Thammarachathirat (1569–1590), a Thai governor who had aided the Burmese, was installed as vassal king at Ayutthaya. Thai independence was restored by his son, King Naresuan (1590–1605), who turned on the Burmese and by 1600 had driven them from the country.

Determined to prevent another treason like his father's, Naresuan set about unifying the country's administration directly under the royal court at Ayutthaya. He ended the practice of nominating royal princes to govern Ayutthaya's provinces, assigning instead court officials who were expected to execute policies handed down by the king. Thereafter royal princes were confined to the capital. Their power struggles continued, but at court under the king's watchful eye.

To ensure his control over the new class of governors, Naresuan decreed that all freemen subject to phrai service had become phrai luang, bound directly to the king, who distributed the use of their services to his officials. This measure gave the king a theoretical monopoly on all manpower, and the idea developed that since the king owned the services of all the people, he also possessed all the land. Ministerial offices and governorships—and the sakdina that went with them—were usually inherited positions dominated by a few families often connected to the king by marriage. Indeed, marriage was frequently used by Thai kings to cement alliances between themselves and powerful families, a custom prevailing through the 19th century. As a result of this policy, the king's wives usually numbered in the dozens.

Even with Naresuan's reforms, the effectiveness of the royal government over the next 150 years was unstable. Royal power outside the crown lands—in theory, absolute—was in practice limited by the laxity of the civil administration. The influence of central government and the king was not extensive beyond the capital. When war with the Burmese broke out in the late 18th century, provinces easily abandoned the capital. As the enforcing troops were not easily rallied to defend the capital, the city of Ayutthaya could not stand against the Burmese aggressors.

Military 

Ayutthaya's military was the origin of the Royal Thai Army. The army was organized into a small standing army of a few thousand, which defended the capital and the palace, and a much larger conscript-based wartime army. Conscription was based on the Phrai system (including phrai luang and phrai som), which required local chiefs to supply their predetermined quota of men from their jurisdiction on the basis of population in times of war. This basic system of military organization was largely unchanged down to the early Rattanakosin period.

The main weaponry of the infantry largely consisted of swords, spears and bow and arrows. The infantry units were supported by cavalry and elephantry corps.

Territory 
According to a French source, Ayutthaya in the 18th century included these principal cities: Martaban, Ligor or Nakhon Sri Thammarat, Tenasserim, Junk Ceylon or Phuket Island, Singora or Songkhla. Her tributaries were Patani, Pahang, Perak, Kedah and Malacca. 

Particularly in the South, Ayutthaya's claims were often discredited or underplayed by the Malay sultanates, resulting in some number of military expeditions starting in the 17th and 18th centuries to subjugate querulous sultanates, most infamously with King Narai's military expedition to the Sultanate of Singora in 1680.

Culture and society

Population 
For the entirety of the Ayutthaya Kingdom's duration, it was largely managed by a society of a service nobility composed of a few thousand and serfs (phrai) composed of the rest of the population, comparable to the contemporary Ancien Regime in France or Feudalism in the rest of Europe. The social ladder existed during times of war and, particularly during the late Ayutthaya period, of rich commoners challenging the societal status quo of the Ayutthaya Kingdom as a result of commercial prosperity during the kingdom's last 150 years of peaceful existence. 

According to the historian Chris Baker, the Ayutthaya peasantry practiced commuter agriculturalism and largely lived in dense areas along the canals leading up to the city of Ayutthaya and other cities within the kingdom, producing homemade goods and textiles for the international market.

Language 
The Siamese (Thai) language was initially spoken only by the Ayutthaya elite, but gradually grew to transcend social classes and becoming widespread throughout the kingdom by the Late Ayutthaya period (1688-1767), although the Mon language was spoken among everyday people throughout the Chao Phraya delta until as late as  1515. The Khmer language was an early prestige language of the Ayutthaya court, until it was supplanted by the Siamese language, however it was still continually spoken by the ethnic Khmer community living in Ayutthaya. Many variants of Chinese were spoken, with the Chinese becoming a large minority in the kingdom during the Late Ayutthaya period.

Various minority languages spoken inside the kingdom included Malay, Persian, Japanese, Cham, Dutch, Portuguese, etc...

Religion 

Ayutthaya's main religion was Theravada Buddhism. However, many of the elements of the political and social system were incorporated from Hindu scriptures and were conducted by Brahmin priests. Many areas of the kingdom also practiced Mahayana Buddhism, Islam and, influenced by French Missionaries who arrived through China in the 17th century, some small areas converted to Roman Catholicism. The influence of Mahayana and Tantric practices also entered Theravada Buddhism, producing a tradition called Tantric Theravada.

The natural world was also home to a number of spirits which are part of the Satsana Phi. Phi are spirits of buildings or territories, natural places, or phenomena; they are also ancestral spirits that protect people, or can also include malevolent spirits. The phi which are guardian deities of places, or towns are celebrated at festivals with communal gatherings and offerings of food. The spirits run throughout Thai folklore.

Phi were believed to influence natural phenomena including human illness and thus the baci became an important part of people identity and religious health over the millennia. Spirit houses were an important folk custom which were used to ensure balance with the natural and supernatural world. Astrology was also a vital part to understanding the natural and spiritual worlds and became an important cultural means to enforce social taboos and customs.

Arts and performances 

The myth and epic stories of Ramakien provide the Siamese with a rich source of dramatic materials. The royal court of Ayutthaya developed classical dramatic forms of expression called khon and lakhon. Ramakien played a role in shaping these dramatic arts. During the Ayutthaya period, khon, or a dramatized version of Ramakien, was classified as lakhon nai or a theatrical performance reserved only for aristocratic audience. The Siamese drama and classical dance later spread throughout mainland Southeast Asia and influenced the development of high-culture art in most countries, including Burma, Cambodia, and Laos.

Historical evidence shows that the Thai art of stage plays must have already been highly evolved by the 17th century. Louis XIV, the Sun King of France, had a formal diplomatic relation with Ayutthaya's King Narai. In 1687, France sent the diplomat Simon de la Loubère to record all that he saw in the Siamese Kingdom. In his famous account Du Royaume de Siam, La Loubère carefully observed the classic 17th century theatre of Siam, including an epic battle scene from a khon performance, and recorded what he saw in great detail:

Of the attire of Siamese Khôn dancers, La Loubère recorded that, "[T]hose that dance in Rabam, and Cone, have gilded paper-bonnets, high and pointed, like the Mandarins caps of ceremony, but which hang down at the sides below their ears, which are adorned with counterfeit stones, and with two pendants of gilded wood."

La Loubère also observed the existence of muay Thai and muay Laos, noting that they looked similar (i.e., using both fists and elbows to fight) but the hand-wrapping techniques were different.

The accomplishment and influence of Thai art and culture, developed during the Ayutthaya period, on the neighboring countries was evident in the observation of James Low, a British scholar on Southeast Asia, during the early-Rattanakosin Era: "The Siamese have attained to a considerable degree of perfection in dramatic exhibitions – and are in this respect envied by their neighbours the Burmans, Laos, and Cambojans who all employ Siamese actors when they can be got."

Literature

Ayutthaya was a kingdom rich in literary production. Even after the sack of Ayutthaya in 1767, many literary masterpieces in the Thai language survived. However, Ayutthayan literature (as well as Thai literature before the modern era) was dominated by verse composition (i.e., poetry), whereas prose works were reserved to legal matters, records of state affairs and historical chronicles. Thus, there are many works in the nature of epic poetry in the Thai language. The Thai poetical tradition was originally based on indigenous poetical forms such as rai (ร่าย), khlong (โคลง), kap (กาพย์) and klon (กลอน). Some of these poetical forms—notably khlong—have been shared between the speakers of tai languages since ancient time (before the emergence of Siam).

Tamil influence on the Siamese language

Through Buddhist and Hindu influence, a variety of Chanda prosodic meters were received via Ceylon. Since the Thai language is mono-syllabic, a huge number of loan words from Sanskrit, Tamil and Pali are needed to compose these classical Sanskrit meters. According to B.J. Terwiel, this process occurred with an accelerated pace during the reign of King Borommatrailokkanat (1448–1488) who reformed Siam's model of governance by turning the Siamese polity into an empire under the mandala feudal system. The new system demanded a new imperial language for the noble class. This literary influence changed the course of the Thai or Siamese language, setting it apart from other tai languages, by increasing the number of Sanskrit and Pali words drastically and imposing the demand on the Thais to develop a writing system that preserves the orthography of Sanskrit words for literary purpose. By the 15th century, the Thai language had evolved into a distinctive medium along with a nascent literary identity of a new nation. It allowed Siamese poets to compose in different poetical styles and mood, from playful and humorous rimed verses, to romantic and elegant klong and to polished and imperious chan prosodies modified from classical Sanskrit meters. Thai poets experimented with these different prosodic forms, producing innovative "hybrid" poems such as Lilit (an interleave of khlong and kap or rai verses) or Kap hor Klong ( - khlong poems enveloped by kap verses). The Thai thus developed a keen mind and a keen ear for poetry. To maximize this new literary medium, however, an intensive classical education in Pali was required. This made poetry an exclusive occupation of the noble classes. However, B.J. Terwiel notes, citing a 17th-century text book Jindamanee, that scribes and common Siamese men, too, were encouraged to learn basic Pali and Sanskrit for career advancement.

Ramakien 

Most countries in Southeast Asia share an Indianised culture. Traditionally, therefore, Thai literature was heavily influenced by the Indian culture and Buddhist-Hindu ideology since the time it first appeared in the 13th century. Thailand's national epic is a version of the story of Rama-Pandita, as recounted by Gotama Buddha in the Dasharatha Jataka called the Ramakien, translated from Pali and rearranged into Siamese verses. The importance of the Ramayana epic in Thailand is due to the Thai's adoption of the Hindu religio-political ideology of kingship, as embodied by Rama. The Siamese capital, Ayutthaya, was named after the holy city of Ayodhya, the city of Rama. Thai kings of the current dynasty from Rama VI forward, and retroactively, have been referred to as "Rama" to the present day (relations with the west caused the crown to seek a brief name to convey royalty to both Thais and foreigners, following European styles).

A number of versions of the Ramakien epic were lost in the destruction of Ayutthaya in 1767. Three versions currently exist. One of these was prepared under the supervision (and partly written by) King Rama I. His son, Rama II, rewrote some parts for khon drama. The main differences from the original are an extended role for the monkey god Hanuman and the addition of a happy ending. Many of popular poems among the Thai nobles are also based on Indian stories. One of the most famous is Anirut Kham Chan which is based on an ancient Indian story of Prince Anirudha.

Khun Chang Khun Phaen: the Siamese epic folk poem

In the Ayutthaya period, folktales also flourished. One of the most famous folktales is the story of Khun Chang Khun Phaen, referred to in Thailand simply as "Khun Phaen", which combines the elements of romantic comedy and heroic adventures, ending in high tragedy. The epic of Khun Chang Khun Phaen (KCKP) revolves around Khun Phaen, a Siamese general with superhuman magical powers who served the King of Ayutthaya, and his love-triangle relationship between himself, Khun Chang, and a beautiful Siamese girl named Wan-Thong. The composition of KCKP, much like other orally-transmitted epics, evolved over time. It originated as a recitation or sepha within the Thai oral tradition from around the beginning of the 17th century (c. 1600). Siamese troubadours and minstrels added more subplots and embellished scenes to the original story line as time went on. By the late period of the Ayutthaya Kingdom, it had attained the current shape as a long work of epic poem with the length of about 20,000 lines, spanning 43 samut thai books. The version that exists today was composed with klon meter throughout and is referred to in Thailand as nithan Kham Klon meaning a 'poetic tale'.

Architecture 

The Ayutthaya Buddhist temple falls into one of two broad categories: the stupa-style solid temple and the prang-style. The prangs can also be found in various forms in Sukhothai, Lopburi, Bangkok (Wat Arun). Sizes may vary, but usually the prangs measure between 15 and 40 meters in height, and resemble a towering corn-cob like structure.

Prangs essentially represent Mount Meru. In Thailand Buddha relics were often housed in a vault in these structures, reflecting the belief that the Buddha is a most significant being, having attained enlightenment and having shown the path to enlightenment to others.

Notable archeological sites

Daily life

Clothing

Three clothing styles were evident in the Ayutthaya period. Each style depended on social class.

1. Court clothing (worn by the king, queen, concubines, and senior government officials): 
Men: The king wore mongkut, as headgear, round Mandarin collar with khrui and wore chong kben, as trousers. 
Court officers, (who served in the royal palace) wore lomphok, as headgear, khrui, and wore chong kben.
Women The queen wore chada, as headgear, sabai, (a breast cloth that wrap over one shoulder around chest and back) and wore pha nung, as a skirt. 
 Concubines wore long hair, sabai, and pha nung.
2. Nobles (rich citizens):
Men: wore mandarin collar shirt, a mahadthai hair style, and wore chong kben. 
Women: wore the sabai and pha nung.
3. Villagers: 
Men: wore a loincloth, displayed a naked chest, a mahadthai hair style, sometimes wore sarong or chong kben. 
Women: wore the sabai and pha nung.

Economy 
The Thais never lacked a rich food supply. Peasants planted rice for their own consumption and to pay taxes. Whatever remained was used to support religious institutions. From the 13th to the 15th centuries, however, a transformation took place in Thai rice cultivation. In the highlands, where rainfall had to be supplemented by a system of irrigation to control water levels in flooded paddies, the Thais sowed the glutinous rice that is still the staple in the geographical regions of the north and northeast. But in the floodplain of the Chao Phraya, farmers turned to a different variety of rice—the so-called floating rice, a slender, non-glutinous grain introduced from Bengal—that would grow fast enough to keep pace with the rise of the water level in the lowland fields.

The new strain grew easily and abundantly, producing a surplus that could be sold cheaply abroad. Ayutthaya, at the southern extremity of the floodplain, thus became the hub of economic activity. Under royal patronage, corvée labour dug canals on which rice was brought from the fields to the king's ships for export to China. In the process, the Chao Phraya delta—mud flats between the sea and firm land hitherto considered unsuitable for habitation—was reclaimed and cultivated. Traditionally the king had a duty to perform a religious ceremony to bless the rice planting.

Although rice was abundant in Ayutthaya, rice exports were banned from time to time when famine occurred because of natural calamity or war. Rice was usually bartered for luxury goods and armaments from Westerners, but rice cultivation was mainly for the domestic market and rice export was evidently unreliable.

Trade

Currency

Ayutthaya officially used cowrie shells, prakab (baked clay coins), and pod duang as currencies. Pod duang became the standard medium of exchange from the early-13th century to the reign of King Chulalongkorn.

Ayutthaya as international trading port 

Trade with Europeans was lively in the 17th century. In fact European merchants traded their goods, mainly modern arms such as rifles and cannons, for local products from the inland jungle such as sappan (lit. 'bridge') woods, deerskin, and rice. Tomé Pires, a Portuguese voyager, mentioned in the 16th century that Ayutthaya, or Odia, was "rich in good merchandise". Most of the foreign merchants coming to Ayutthaya were European and Chinese, and were taxed by the authorities. The kingdom had an abundance of rice, salt, dried fish, arrack, and vegetables.

Trade with foreigners, mainly the Dutch, reached its peak in the 17th century. Ayutthaya became a main destination for merchants from China and Japan. It was apparent that foreigners began taking part in the kingdom's politics. Ayutthaya's kings employed foreign mercenaries who sometimes joined the wars with the kingdom's enemies. However, after the purge of the French in the late-17th century, the major traders with Ayutthaya were the Chinese. The Dutch from the Dutch East Indies Company (Vereenigde Oost-Indische Compagnie or VOC), were still active. Ayutthaya's economy declined rapidly in the 18th century, until the Burmese invasion caused the total collapse of Ayutthaya's economy in 1767.

Contacts with the West 
In 1511, immediately after having conquered Malacca, the Portuguese sent a diplomatic mission headed by Duarte Fernandes to the court of King Ramathibodi II of Ayutthaya. Having established amicable relations between the Kingdom of Portugal and the Kingdom of Siam, they returned with a Siamese envoy who carried gifts and letters to the King of Portugal. The Portuguese were the first Europeans to visit the country. Portuguese mercenaries would also play a major role in the invasion of Lanna in 1539 by King Chairachathirat, and Portuguese soldiers would be considered a respected fighting force for the Kingdom across its existence. Five years after that initial contact, Ayutthaya and Portugal concluded a treaty granting the Portuguese permission to trade in the kingdom. A similar treaty in 1592 gave the Dutch a privileged position in the rice trade.

Foreigners were cordially welcomed at the court of Narai (1657–1688), a ruler with a cosmopolitan outlook who was nonetheless wary of outside influence. Important commercial ties were forged with Japan. Dutch and English trading companies were allowed to establish factories, and Thai diplomatic missions were sent to Paris and The Hague. By maintaining these ties, the Thai court skillfully played off the Dutch against the English and the French, avoiding the excessive influence of a single power.

In 1664, however, the Dutch used force to exact a treaty granting them extraterritorial rights as well as freer access to trade. At the urging of his foreign minister, the Greek adventurer Constantine Phaulkon, Narai turned to France for assistance. French engineers constructed fortifications for the Thais and built a new palace at Lopburi for Narai. In addition, French missionaries engaged in education and medicine and brought the first printing press into the country. Louis XIV's personal interest was aroused by reports from missionaries suggesting that Narai might be converted to Christianity.

The French presence encouraged by Phaulkon, however, stirred the resentment and suspicions of the Thai nobles and Buddhist clergy. When word spread that Narai was dying, a general, Phetracha (reigned 1688–1693) staged a coup d'état, the 1688 Siamese revolution, seized the throne, killed the designated heir, a Christian, and had Phaulkon put to death along with a number of missionaries. He then expelled the remaining foreigners. Some studies said that Ayutthaya began a period of alienation from Western traders, while welcoming more Chinese merchants. But other recent studies argue that, due to wars and conflicts in Europe in the mid-18th century, European merchants reduced their activities in the East. However, it was apparent that the Dutch East Indies Company or VOC was still doing business in Ayutthaya despite political difficulties.

Contacts with East Asia 

Between 1405 and 1433, the Chinese Ming dynasty sponsored a series of seven naval expeditions. Emperor Yongle designed them to establish a Chinese presence, impose imperial control over trade, and impress foreign peoples in the Indian Ocean basin. He also might have wanted to extend the tributary system. It is believed that the Chinese fleet under Admiral Zheng He travelled up the Chao Phraya River to Ayutthaya on three occasions.

Meanwhile, a Japanese colony was established in Ayutthaya. The colony was active in trade, particularly in the export of deer hides and saphan wood to Japan in exchange for Japanese silver and Japanese handicrafts (swords, lacquered boxes, high-quality paper). From Ayutthaya, Japan was interested in purchasing Chinese silks, as well as deerskins and ray or shark skins (used to make a sort of shagreen for Japanese sword handles and scabbards).

The Japanese quarters of Ayutthaya were home to about 1,500 Japanese inhabitants (some estimates run as high as 7,000). The community was called Ban Yipun in Thai, and was headed by a Japanese chief nominated by Thai authorities. It seems to have been a combination of traders, Christian converts (Kirishitan) who had fled their home country to various Southeast Asian countries following the persecutions of Toyotomi Hideyoshi and Tokugawa Ieyasu, and unemployed former samurai who had been on the losing side at the battle of Sekigahara.

Padre António Francisco Cardim recounted having administered the sacrament to around 400 Japanese Christians in 1627 in the Thai capital of Ayuthaya ("a 400 japoes christaos") There were also Japanese communities in Ligor and Patani.

Notable foreigners in 17th century Ayutthaya 
 Constantine Phaulkon, Greek adventurer and first councillor of King Narai
 François-Timoléon de Choisy
 Father Guy Tachard, French Jesuit writer and Siamese Ambassador to France (1688)
 Louis Laneau, Apostolic Vicar of Siam
 Claude de Forbin, French Admiral
 Yamada Nagamasa, Japanese adventurer who became the ruler of the Nakhon Si Thammarat
 George White (merchant), English merchant
 Jeremias van Vliet, Dutch Opperhoofd

Historiography

Contemporary accounts of Ayutthaya 
The amount to which Ayutthaya texts were destroyed in the Burmese sack of 1767 varies greatly. Van Vliet's written records on Siam is the earliest written history of Siam and Ayutthaya, which date from the early to mid 17th century and likely used the religious temple chronicles as his source. The earliest surviving palace chronicle is the Luang Prasoet chronicle, which dates from 1681. The histories of Ayutthaya was not regarded as important until the age of commerce and peace in the 17th and 18th centuries. Early Ayutthaya did not write down its history. The religious chronicles are also important to understanding Ayutthaya, which date as early as the 16th century. Early Ayutthaya did not write down its history. A significant portion of written evidence must therefore come from outside accounts. Aside from Van Vliet, a number of Europeans in the 17th and early 18th century wrote surviving accounts of Siam. The Chinese palace chronicles are also instrumental in analyzing Ayutthaya's history.

Post-Ayutthaya historiography 
The history of the Ayutthaya Kingdom overall has been a neglected period of historiography in Thailand, as well as abroad, characterized by well-researched and popular histories of subperiods of Ayutthaya. Chris Baker and Pasuk Phongpaichit's "A History of Ayutthaya: Siam In the Early Modern World", published in 2017, was the first English-academic book to have analyzed the full four hundred years of the Ayutthaya Kingdom's existence. The historiography of Southeast Asia originated from post-colonial capitals. As Thailand had never been fully colonized, it never had a European patron from which national histories could be written about themselves until the arrival of the Americans in the 1960s.

In the early Rattanakosin period, King Rama I compiled all surviving Ayutthaya law records and published the Three Seals Law in 1805. Early Rattanakosin period documents traced their "national" origins to the founding of Ayutthaya in 1351. In the early 20th-century however, Thai elites, influenced by Western ideas of European nationalism and the nation state, used that framework to create a nationalist history of Thailand, implementing it in ways deemphasized Ayutthaya's importance to Thai history by portraying the Sukhothai Kingdom as the first "Thai" kingdom or golden age of "Thai-ness" (Buddhism, Thai-style democracy, free trade, abolition of slavery), Rattanakosin as the "rebirth", and Ayutthaya as a period of decline between Sukhothai and Rattanakosin. This resulted in Ayutthaya being largely forgotten in the historiography of Thailand for half a century following the works of Prince Damrong in the early 20th century.

The nationalist-themed histories of Ayutthaya, pioneered by Prince Damrong, primarily featured the stories of kings fighting wars and the idea of Eurocentric territorial subjugation of neighboring states. These historical themes remains influential in Thailand and in Thai popular history up until the present, which has only been challenged by a newer generation of historians and academics in Thailand and abroad starting in the 1980s, emphasizing the long-neglected commercial and economic aspects which were important to Ayutthaya. New released sources and translations from a variety of historical records (China, the Netherlands, etc...) have made the researching of Ayutthaya history more accessible in the past two and three decades.

Since the 1970s, newer generations of academics have come up and challenged the old historiography, paying more attention and publishing works about the history of Ayutthaya, prominently beginning with Charnvit Kasetsiri's "The Rise of Ayudhya", published in 1977. Kasetsiri, in 1999, argues that, "Ayutthaya was the first major political, cultural, and commercial center of the Thai."

The "General Crisis" hypothesis 

The idea that Ayutthaya suffered a decline following the departure of Europeans in the late 17th century was an idea popularized, at first, in the Rattanakosin court, in an attempt to legitimize the new dynasty over the Ayutthaya Ban Phlu Luang dynasty, and more famously by Anthony Reid's book on the "Age of Commerce" in recent decades. However, more recent studies, such as by Victor Lieberman in "Strange Parallels in Southeast Asia" and by Baker and Phongpaichit in "A History of Ayutthaya", have mostly refuted Reid's hypothesis, in particular Lieberman criticizing Reid's methodology of using the example of Maritime Southeast Asia to explain Mainland Southeast Asia, citing the opening of Qing China's revocation of its maritime ban and the subsequent increase in trade between China and Siam and Ayutthaya's historical importance as a regional Asian trade center rather than one in which Europeans held any power or any significant influence for any extended period of time.

Gallery

In popular culture
 Love Destiny (TV series) (Bupphesanniwat), 2018 Thai historical television series.
 The Legend of Suriyothai, 2001 Thai biographical historical drama film series about Queen Suriyothai.
 King Naresuan (film), 2007–2015 Thai biographical historical drama film series about King Naresuan.

See also 
 Ayutthaya Historical Park
 Ayutthaya Province
 Baan Hollanda
 Bang Rajan
 Family tree of Ayutthaya kings
 History of Thailand
 List of Ayutthaya kings

Notes

Citations

General references 
 Original text adapted from the Library of Congress Country Study of Thailand

Further reading

General works

Royal Chronicles of Ayutthaya
There are 18 versions of Royal Chronicles of Ayutthaya (Phongsawadan Krung Si Ayutthaya) known to scholars. See: .
 Fifteenth-Century Fragment –  Michael Vickery version(in English and Thai) and Ubonsi Atthaphan version in pp.215-231 (in Thai)
 Van Vliet Chronicle (1640) – Translated and compiled by the Dutch merchant. The original Thai manuscripts disappeared.
 The Luang Prasoet Version (1680) – Ayutthaya History (in Thai)
 CS 1136 Version (1774)
 The Nai (Nok) Kaeo Version (1782) – in pp.232-244 (in Thai)
 CS 1145 Version (1783)
 [ Sanggitiyavamsa] – Pali chronicle compiled by Phra Phonnarat, generally discussing Buddhism History of Thailand.
 CS 1157 Version of Phan Chanthanumat (1795)
 Thonburi Chronicle (1795)
 Somdet Phra Phonnarat Version (1795) – Thought to be identical to Bradley Version below.
 Culayuddhakaravamsa Vol.2 – Pali chronicle. – includes other three versions of the chronicle.
 Phra Chakraphatdiphong (Chat) Version (1808) (in Thai)
 Brith Museum Version (1807)
 Wat Ban Thalu Version (1812)
 Culayuddhakaravamsa Sermon (1820) . – includes other three versions of the chronicle.
 Bradley or Two-Volume Version (1864) – formerly called Krom Phra Paramanuchit Chinorot Version. [Vol. 1] [Vol. 2] [Vol. 3] or Vol.1 [ Vol.2]
 Pramanuchit's Abridged Version (1850) (in English)
 Royal Autograph Version (1855) – Vol. 1, Vol. 2 

Some of these are available in Cushman, Richard D. (2000). The Royal Chronicles of Ayutthaya: A Synoptic Translation, edited by David K. Wyatt. Bangkok: The Siam Society.

Burmese accounts 
These are Burmese historical accounts of Ayutthaya.
 Kham Hai Kan Chao Krung Kao (Lit. Testimony of inhabitants of Old Capital (i.e., Ayutthaya))
 Kham Hai Kan Khun Luang Ha Wat (Lit. Testimony of the "King who Seeks a Temple" (nickname of King Uthumphon)) – An English translation.
 Palm Leaf Manuscripts No.11997 of the Universities Central Library Collection or Yodaya Yazawin – Available in English in Tun Aung Chain tr. (2005) Chronicle of Ayutthaya, Yangon: Myanmar Historical Commission

Western accounts 
 Second Voyage du Pere Tachard et des Jesuites envoyes par le Roi au Royaume de Siam.  Paris: Horthemels, 1689.

External links 

 Online Collection: Southeast Asia Visions Collection by Cornell University Library
 Ayutthaya Historical Research

Ayutthaya Kingdom
Tai history
Former countries in Thai history
Former kingdoms
Indianized kingdoms
13th century in Thailand
14th century in Thailand
15th century in Thailand
16th century in Thailand
17th century in Thailand
18th century in Siam
1750s in Thailand
1760s in Thailand
1767 in Thailand
1351 establishments in Asia
1767 disestablishments
1760s disestablishments in Asia
14th-century establishments in Thailand
1760s disestablishments in Thailand
Former monarchies of Southeast Asia
States and territories established in 1351